The Way Off Broadway Dinner Theatre, also known as Way Off Broadway or WOB, is a regional dinner theater and children's theater located in Frederick, Maryland, United States.

History
The theater was first launched in 1990 as the Keynote Dinner Theatre under the direction of Don Wiswell with a production of the musical Grease. It was not until 1995, when the theater was purchased by the partnership of Pete Peterson, Terrance Warfield, and Jim Watkins, that it was renamed Way Off Broadway. The following year, Way Off Broadway's Children's Theatre was created, opening with an original production of Sleeping Beauty. It was also in 1996, a year and a half after they bought the theater, that Peterson, Warfield, and Watkins sold WOB to Susan Thornton, the creator of the Children's Theatre. Way Off Broadway was purchased by the Kiska family in 2002, beginning their ownership of the theater with a production of A Funny Thing Happened on the Way to the Forum. The Kiskas remain the theater's current owners.

Productions

Mainstage
Each season, Way Off Broadway produces five Broadway-style mainstage productions. These range from the classics by Rodgers and Hammerstein and Kender and Ebb, to contemporary and current stage shows by Andrew Lloyd Webber and David Yazbek.
Way Off Broadway has been credited with bringing many theatrical premieres to the area. In 2009, WOB was one of the first theaters in the country to obtain the rights to produce a regional theater production of the musical comedy The Wedding Singer. Neil Simon’s The Goodbye Girl - The Musical, La Cage aux Folles, Thoroughly Modern Millie, Mel Brooks’ The Producers, All Shook Up, and Dirty Rotten Scoundrels all made their western Maryland regional theater debuts at WOB.

Children’s Theatre
The Way Off Broadway Children's Theatre presents four original productions each year. These are musical adaptations of popular fairy tales and children's stories written specifically for the theater. Most notably was WOB's 2005 world premiere stage production of Mr. Willowby's Christmas Tree, based on the 1963 children's book of the same name by Robert Barry. Until that time, Jim Henson’s Muppets had been the only group to obtain the rights to adapt Barry’s story, turning it into a television Christmas special in 1995. In an interview, Barry later said he preferred Way Off Broadway’s adaptation, which had been written by Susan Thornton, the Children’s Theatre’s director, over the Muppets version.

Other performances and theater activities
Way Off Broadway, in addition to its Mainstage and Children's Theatre, offers original interactive murder mysteries during the season. The Children’s Theatre Breakfast Series includes an annual Princess Breakfast and Breakfast with Santa.

In the fall of 2019, Way Off Broadway co-produced the first regional theatre production of the new musical comedy The Book of Merman, which had made its Off-Broadway premiere the winter before at New York’s St. Luke’s Theatre.  WOB’s production starred Melissa Ann Martin as Ethel Merman, Joseph Waeyaert as Elder Braithwaite, and Paul Cabell as Elder Shumway.  The production was co-produced with Justin M. Kiska and Jessica Billones.

Venue
The theater is located in Frederick, Maryland, west of Baltimore and north of Washington, D.C. Since it opened, it has operated in the same location, in the Willowtree Plaza along Route 40, also known as Frederick’s "Golden Mile." A traditional proscenium style theater, Way Off Broadway serves a buffet meal to its audiences, who watch the show from their tables. The serving staff is made up of cast and crew members from the productions.

WOB Entertainment
On November 11, 2010, Way Off Broadway announced the formation of WOB Entertainment, a multi-faceted division to manage all of the company's activities outside of the theater. Designed to develop, produce, and present stage productions at venues outside of the Way Off Broadway Dinner Theatre, it offers theatrical consulting and operation services as well, both creative and managerial, to other arts and commercial organizations and companies. WOB Entertainment also acts as the agent and representative for all of the original works first produced at Way Off Broadway, including its interactive murder mysteries, holiday productions, and the Children's Theatre Collection.

See also
 List of dinner theaters

References

External links
Way Off Broadway Dinner Theatre

Dinner theatre
Theatres in Maryland
Tourist attractions in Frederick County, Maryland
1990 establishments in Maryland